The Holy Ghost Forane Church, or Ruha d Qudisha Church, located at Muttuchira village of Kottayam district, Kerala, India, is believed to be established in the sixth century AD and is one of the ancient churches in Kerala. The church is famous for the presence of ancient granite St Thomas cross, ancient stone writings and ancient mural paintings. The church is under the Syro-Malabar Diocese of Palai.

Liturgy
Sundays
05:30 am, 07:00 am, 09:30 am, 04:30 pm (06:30 am; Arunassery Chapel)
Weekdays (Monday to Saturday)
05:30am, 07:00am
Weekdays (in periods of annunciation and Great Fast)
05:30 am, 07:00 am, 04:30 pm

History
Muttuchira is a village in the Kottayam District situated in the South Indian State of Kerala. It is called as Nayappalli in old records . As per tradition, the Christian settlement of Muttuchira was built up in the sixth century. Antonio Gouvea, the Portuguese voyager who went with Alexis De Menezes, the Archbishop of Goa, recorded the Menezes' visit of Muttuchira in AD 1599. Gouvea used the term Nayapili to mean Muttuchira. The church was called as  Spiritu Sancto' (Latin word for Holy Spirit).

Johannes Facundus Raulin in the 1740s in his book 'Historia Ecclesia Malabaricae uses the term Muttieri. Anquetil Du Perron, a French Scholar and Orientalist in January 1758, mentions about the Catholic church of Holy Ghost at Muttiera and mentions of Saint Sebastian.

The Muttuchira church is one of the most ancient churches in India. It is believed to be built up in the sixth century AD. The Christians to this territory were brought by the dependants of the then land lord Myal Pazhur Naboothiripadu and Mamalassery Kaimal. These local rulers helped the Christian congregation to built a new church in that area. Kallarveli family was a prominent one who helped to built the church. Later many others came and settled here from other places . This was an agricultural area mainly of ginger and paddy. The Muttuchira market also came into existence gradually. It is said that Muttuchira had commodity transactions with Kochi back then. The consecration day of Muttuchira church was on the arrival of Pentecost on 25 May 550 AD. The old main church was at a site called Kurisummoodu near Muttuchira market.

The ancient cross with a granite base standing in Kurisummoodu is adorned with beautiful carvings. The main church was with traditional arch shaped madbaha with a cross and a sacrificial table . As the church members increased in number, the church space became inadequate and another congregation was established in the seventh century. This new church was built in the site of the present kochupally (little church) inside the compound.

The church was harmed during the assault of the Mukalan rulers in ninth century AD. The church bells were taken away by them. That church was later remodelled and used till the 12th century. It was remodeled again in the 13th century. This church was named after the Holy Ghost. This church had the sanctity behind, verandas on both sides and the spaces for the ministers to keep afloat. Denha thirunal was important in this church. It is said that 'the Pontifical Raza of Bishop Mar Parambil Chandy after his ecclesiastical appointment was offered at Muttuchira church'.

An ancient Saint Thomas Christian cross was discovered inside the madbaha wall, when the old church at Muttuchira was demolished. This cross is believed to be of the fifth century. The paleontology chief of Travancore Government examined this cross. His assessment is that the cross must be over 1500 years of age. The houses of worship at Maylappur, Kadamattam, Angamali and Kottayam Valiyapally also have such Persian crosses.  This St Thomas cross is set near the entryway inside the new Valiyapally (great church) now.

However the verifiable records specify that the stone cross in front of the church was made and presented to the church by Kallarveli Kurisingal Mathai Chacko in the thirteenth century. Muttuchira church was known as 'Njayapally'in olden days. There was no place called Muttuchira back then. The paddy fields that we seen today close to the church could have been lakes before in olden days. The name Muttuchira more likely came into existence when these sites were raised with bunds.

The present Valiapally (great church) and the presbytery were built amid the reign of Rev. Fr. Kuriakose Parambil, who was the ward minister here since 1859. This is elevated to a Forane church since 1890. The development of the five storied chime tower was begun amid the reign of Rev. Fr. Ouseph Chakkalackal, who was the ward cleric in 1901. There are three major bells on the fifth floor. The chime tower has a cross on top of it. The height of the chime tower is 150 feet.

Ancient Mural collections

Muttuchira Church has a good collection of ancient paintings.

Muttuchira stone inscriptions

Muttuchira stone engravings are old Malayalam engravings called Vattezhuthu-Nanam Monum. These engravings are that describing about the establishment of the old cross and the Pahlavi recordings are of the  'Muttuchira Sliba'. The engravings are on a rectangular stone piece in two areas partitioned by a vertical line in the middle. As indicated by Mr T K Joseph, this engravings must be of AD1581 or later. This tablet has been the subject of broad examination by numerous researchers. This rock chunk was found on the western mass of the ground floor room of the two story building joined toward the northern side of the old Church of the Holy Ghost. The upper story was used as Priest's residence and the ground floor was used as the sacristy.

Following is the English translation of the inscription on the granite plaque:
By the command of the lord in AD 1528 Mar Thana [Mar Denha] and Mar Avu [ Jacob Abuna ]  along with Giwargis Padre, installed this Holy Cross in this place. After this, Giwargis padre went to Portugal along with his nephew Mathai padre. In AD 1580,  kanni 13 sunday, on the day of the feast of Holy Cross, this mar Sliva was erected covered in wood, by Bishop Mar Simon and Jacob [ Archdeacon Jacob ] Padre. Same year, on the day of 18th on the day of the feast, this bleeding Cross was installed. AD 1581 meenam month on the 29th friday good friday, this granite Cross was installed.

References

Churches in Kottayam district
Syro-Malabar Catholic church buildings